Khargram Assembly constituency is an assembly constituency in Murshidabad district in the Indian state of West Bengal. It is reserved for scheduled castes.

Overview
As per orders of the Delimitation Commission, No. 66 Khargram Assembly constituency (SC) covers Khargram community development block, and Kalyanpur I and Kalyanpur II gram panchayats Burwan community development block.

Khargram Assembly constituency is part of No. 9 Jangipur (Lok Sabha constituency).

Members of Legislative Assembly

Election results

2021

2011
In the 2011 election, Asish Marjit of Congress defeated his nearest rival Goutam Mondal of CPI(M).

1977–2006
In the 2006 state assembly elections, Manabendranath Saha of CPI(M)  won the 66 Khargram (SC) seat defeating his nearest rival Ashis Marjit of Congress. Contests in most years were multi cornered but only winners and runners are being mentioned. Biswanath Mondal of CPI(M) defeated Madhab Chandra Marjit of Congress in 2001 and 1996, Harendranath Haldar of Congress in 1991, and Ashok Saha of Congress in 1987. Dinabandhu Majhi of CPI(M) defeated Nakari Chandra Majhi of Congress in 1982 and Harendranath Haldar of Congress in 1977.

1951–1972
Harendranath Halder of Congress won in 1972. Narendra Haldar of Congress won in 1971. Kumarish Chandra Moulick of RSP  won in 1969. S.K.Mondal of Congress won in 1967. Abhayapada Saha of RSP won in 1962. The Khargram seat was not there in 1957. In independent India's first election in 1951 Burwan Khargram was a joint seat Satyendra Chandra Ghosh Moulik and Sudhir Mondal, both of Congress, jointly won the Burwan Khargram seat.

References

Assembly constituencies of West Bengal
Politics of Murshidabad district